Standing Female Faun or Standing Fauness is a sculpture by Auguste Rodin in 1910. It is sculpted from white marble and its dimensions are 70.1 x 44.7 x 38.4 cm.

Description
The work represents the conception of a being of hybrid nature which is half human and half ram. On the left-hand-side of the base it is signed "A Miss Gladys Deacon / Auguste Rodin", testifying to the close relationship between the artist and Gladys Deacon.

See also
List of sculptures by Auguste Rodin
Kneeling Female Faun

References

External links

Sculptures by Auguste Rodin
Nude sculptures
1910 sculptures
Fauns in popular culture